The 2015 Red Bull Air Race of Chiba was the second round of the 2015 Red Bull Air Race World Championship season, the tenth season of the Red Bull Air Race World Championship. The event was held in Chiba, a port city in Japan.

Championship leader Paul Bonhomme took his second victory in as many races, finishing 0.382 seconds clear of Matt Hall, who finished second to Bonhomme as he did in Abu Dhabi. The podium was completed by Matthias Dolderer, who matched his career best result with third place. In the Challenger class, Petr Kopfstein took victory by 0.592 seconds ahead of Daniel Ryfa.

Master Class

Qualification

Round of 14

 Pilot received 2 seconds in penalties.
 Pilot received 4 seconds in penalties.
 Pilot received 5 seconds in penalties.
 Pilot received 6 seconds in penalties.

Round of 8

Final 4

Challenger Class

Results

Standings after the event

Master Class standings

Challenger Class standings

 Note: Only the top five positions are included for both sets of standings.

References

External links

|- style="text-align:center"
|width="35%"|Previous race:2015 Red Bull Air Race of Abu Dhabi
|width="30%"|Red Bull Air Race2015 season
|width="35%"|Next race:2015 Red Bull Air Race of Rovinj
|- style="text-align:center"
|width="35%"|Previous race:none
|width="30%"|Red Bull Air Race of Chiba
|width="35%"|Next race:2016 Red Bull Air Race of Chiba
|- style="text-align:center"

Chiba
Red Bull Air Race World Championship